Buttle is a surname. Notable people with the surname include:

Cecil Buttle (1906–1988), English cricketer
Frank Buttle (1878–1953), English social worker
Greg Buttle (born 1954), retired American football linebacker
Jeffrey Buttle (born 1982), Canadian figure skater
Keith Buttle (1900–1973), New Zealand businessman and politician
Robert D. Buttle (died 1901), the sole Brooklyn survivor of the Marine battalion which took part in the Mexican–American War
Steve Buttle (1953–2012), English footballer and manager

Fictional characters:
Buttle family, characters from the 1985 film Brazil